The Fuji T-5 or KM-2Kai is a Japanese turboprop-driven primary trainer aircraft, which is a development of the earlier Fuji KM-2. The student and the instructor sit side-by-side.

Design and development
The Fuji T-5 was developed by Fuji Heavy Industries as a replacement for the piston-engined Fuji KM-2 (itself a development of the Beechcraft T-34 Mentor) as a primary trainer for the Japan Maritime Self-Defense Force. Fuji refitted a KM-2 with an Allison Model 250 turboprop engine in place of the original Lycoming piston engine, the resulting KM-2D first flying on 28 June 1984  and being certified on 14 February 1985. The KM-2Kai is a further development of the KM-2D, with a modernised cockpit with side-by-side seating and a sliding canopy replacing the original KM-2's car type side doors  (which were retained by the KM-2D).

The T-5 is an all-metal low-wing cantilever monoplane powered by an Allison 250-B17D turboprop with a three-bladed constant speed propeller. It has a retractable tricycle landing gear with the main gear retracting inwards and nose gear rearwards. The T-5 has an enclosed cabin with a sliding canopy and two side-by-side seats, and dual controls, in the aerobatic version and four seats in pairs in the utility version.

Operational history
The KM-2Kai was ordered by the JMSDF as the T-5 in March 1987, with deliveries of the KM2-Kai to the Japanese Self Defence Forces beginning in 1988, with a total of 40 being built. The T-5 serves with the 201 Air Training Squadron at Ozuki Air Field.  The original KM-2 is no longer in service.

Operators

 Japan Maritime Self-Defense Force

Specifications (T-5)

See also

References

1980s Japanese military trainer aircraft
Low-wing aircraft
Single-engined tractor aircraft
T-5
Single-engined turboprop aircraft
Aircraft first flown in 1984